The Italian general election of 1983 took place on 26 June 1983. Christian Democracy was the largest party in Sardinia.

Results

Chamber of Deputies

Source: Ministry of the Interior

Senate

Source: Ministry of the Interior

Elections in Sardinia
1983 elections in Italy
June 1983 events in Europe